Ramona is a 1910 American short drama film directed by D. W. Griffith, based on Helen Hunt Jackson's 1884 novel Ramona. Through a love story, the early silent short explores racial injustice to Native Americans and stars Mary Pickford and Henry B. Walthall. A copy of the print survives in the Library of Congress film archive. The film was remade in 1928 (dir. Edwin Carewe) with Dolores del Río and 1936 (dir. Henry King) with Loretta Young.

Plot
Ramona chronicles the romance between Ramona (Mary Pickford), a Spanish orphan from the prestigious Moreno family, and Alessandro (Henry B. Walthall), an Indian who appears on her family's ranch one day. Ramona's foster mother's son Felipe (Francis J. Grandon) proclaims his love for Ramona, but she rejects him because she has fallen for Alessandro. They fall deeply in love, yet their desire to wed is denied by Ramona's foster mother, who reacts by exiling Alessandro from her ranch. He returns to his village, only to find that it has been demolished by white men. Meanwhile, Ramona is informed that she also has "Indian blood", which leads her to abandon everything she has to be with Alessandro. They marry, and live among the wreckage of Alessandro's devastated village. They have a child together and live at peace until the white men come to force them from their home as they claim the land. Their baby perishes, which adds to Alessandro's mental deterioration. Alessandro is then killed by the white men. A devastated Ramona then returns with Felipe back to her family back on the ranch.

Cast

 Mary Pickford as Ramona
 Henry B. Walthall as Alessandro
 Francis J. Grandon as Felipe
 Kate Bruce as The Mother
 W. Chrystie Miller as The Priest
 Dorothy Bernard
 Gertrude Claire as Woman in west
 Robert Harron
 Dell Henderson as Man at burial
 Mae Marsh
 Frank Opperman as Ranch hand
 Anthony O'Sullivan as Ranch hand
 Jack Pickford as A boy
 Mack Sennett as White exploiter

Production
Advertisements for the film emphasized that it was made "by arrangement with Little, Brown, & Company," the publishers of Jackson's novel. The film was shot on location in Ventura County, California, "at identical locations wherein Mrs. Jackson placed her characters."

When D.W. Griffith directed Ramona, the Biograph production company had fallen into hard times. Still based in New York to rival the now broken up Edison Company, Biograph needed a fresh face. Griffith joined the company in 1908 as a writer and actor. Soon, however, the head director of the company, Wallace McCutcheon, fell ill and his son had little success with taking over for him. This led Grifith to become the principal director for the company, and the only director for films made at Biograph between June 1908 and December 1909. During these few months, Griffith turned out an exceptional amount of films, with estimates of one 12 minute and one 16 long minute piece per week. The company actually began its venture out West to Hollywood thanks to Griffith's work on Ramona because he wanted to film on location in Ventura, California.

Longtime friend and colleague of Griffith's Billy Bitzer worked as the cinematographer for the film. Bitzer was hired originally as an electrician for the Biograph company, but his love of cameras pushed him to become one of cinema's most inventive pioneers. He experimented with photography, especially lighting and close-up shots. The Griffith and Bitzer duo formed shortly after Griffith directed his first film, The Adventures of Dollie and continued after both men left the Biograph production company in 1913. Bitzer's experimental nature is beautifully showcased in the film's sweeping landscape shots of the California mountains and distinct editing techniques like cross-cutting.

See also
 List of American films of 1910
 D. W. Griffith filmography
 Mary Pickford filmography
 Ramona (1928 film)
 Ramona (1936 film)

References

External links

 
 
 
 Ramona on YouTube
 

1910 films
1910 drama films
1910 short films
Silent American drama films
American silent short films
American black-and-white films
Films based on American novels
Films set in California
Films directed by D. W. Griffith
Films with screenplays by Stanner E.V. Taylor
Films with screenplays by D. W. Griffith
Films based on Ramona by Helen Hunt Jackson
Articles containing video clips
1910s American films
1910s English-language films